Jean-Claude Villeminot (24 October 1927 – 5 May 1992), better known as Jean-Claude Pascal, was a French comedian, actor, singer and writer.

Early life
He was born in Paris into a family of wealthy textile manufacturers. His mother, Arlette Lemoine, was the great-granddaughter of English fashion designer Charles Frederick Worth. His father, Roger Villeminot, died the year of his birth.

He began his secondary education in 1938 at the Collège Annel, in Compiègne, and concluded it at the Lycée Janson-de-Sailly in Paris. In 1944, at the age of 17, he enlisted in the 2nd Armored Division of General Leclerc. He was the first French soldier to enter Strasbourg in November 1944, while the German Army was still in the process of evacuating the city. For this, he received the Croix de Guerre in 1945.

Career
After surviving World War II in Strasbourg, Pascal studied at the Sorbonne before turning to fashion-designing for Christian Dior. While working on costumes for the theater production of the play Don Juan, he was exposed to acting. His first acting role was in the film Le jugement de Dieu (1949, released in 1952) and afterwards in "Le rideau cramoisi", 1951, opposite Anouk Aimée, followed by several films including  Die schöne Lügnerin (La Belle et l'empereur 1959, 'Beautiful Liar') with Romy Schneider, and Angelique and the Sultan (Angélique et le sultan, 1968) with Michèle Mercier.

Pascal won the 1961 Eurovision Song Contest for Luxembourg with the song "Nous les amoureux" ('We the lovers'), with music composed by Jacques Datin and lyrics by Maurice Vidalin. The song tells the story of a thwarted love between the singer and his lover ("they would like to separate us, they would like to hinder us / from being happy"). The lyrics go on about how the relationship is rejected by others but will finally be possible ("but the time will come. [...] and I will be able to love you without anybody in town talking about it. [...] [God] gave us the right to happiness and joy."). Later, Pascal explained that the song was about a homosexual relationship and the difficulties it faced. As this topic would have been considered controversial in the early 1960s, the lyrics are ambiguous and do not refer to the lovers' gender. This allowed hiding the song's actual message, which was not understood in this way by the general public at the time. Pascal was, himself, gay.

He later represented Luxembourg again in the 1981 contest and finished 11th of 20 with the song "C'est peut-être pas l'Amérique" ('It may not be America'), with words and music he composed together with Sophie Makhno and Jean-Claude Petit. Pascal died in Clichy, Hauts-de-Seine in 1992, aged 64, of stomach cancer.

Discography 
"Lili Marleen" (French and German)
"Nous les amoureux"
"C'est peut-être pas l'Amérique"

Filmography 
Great Man (1951), as L'interne Marcillac 
 They Were Five (1952), as Philippe
 Four Red Roses (1951), as Pietro Leandri
 (1952), as Jean-Pierre
Judgement of God (1952), as Albert III, Duke of Bavaria
 (1952), as Michel Brissac
The Crimson Curtain (1953), as The officer
 A Caprice of Darling Caroline (1953), as Livio
 Children of Love (1953), as Doctor Jacques Baurain
 Alarm in Morocco (1953), as Jean Pasqier
Le Chevalier de la nuit (1953), as Chevalier Georges de Ségar
Tempest in the Flesh (1954), as Gino
Royal Affairs in Versailles (1954), as Axel von Fersen
Flesh and the Woman (1954), as Pierre Martel
The Three Thieves (1954), as Gastone Cascarilla
Caroline and the Rebels (1955), as Juan d'Aranda / de Sallanches
Bad Liaisons (1955), as Blaise Walter
Milord l'Arsouille (1955), as Lord Henry Seymour
 The Wages of Sin (1956), as Jean de Charvin
The Lebanese Mission (1956), as Jean Domèvre
Les Lavandières du Portugal (1957), as Jean-François Aubray
Guinguette (1959), as Marco
Pêcheur d'Islande (1959), as Guillaume Floury
 (1959), as Jacques Moulin
 (1959), as Tsar Alexander I
The Opportunists (1960), as Philippe Brideau
Préméditation (1960), as Bernard Sommet
The Crossroads (1960), as Javier
Le Rendez-vous (1961), as Pierre
 (1962), as Antoine de Montpezat
 (TV film, 1964), as Franck
Vol 272 (TV miniseries, 1964), as Marc
 (TV film, 1965), as Robert
The Poppy Is Also a Flower (1966), as Galam Khan
 (TV series, 1966), as Commandant Jean Leroy-Dantec
 (1967), as Frank Moore
Untamable Angelique (1967), as Osman Ferradji
Angelique and the Sultan (1968), as Osman Ferradji
 Under the Roofs of St. Pauli (1970), as Doctor Pasucha
Au théâtre ce soir: Les Français à Moscou (TV play, 1972), as Blanchet
Le Temps de vivre, le temps d'aimer (TV series, 1973), as Jean Moser 
Le Chirurgien de Saint-Chad (TV series, 1976), as Doctor Patrick Villaresi
Liebe läßt alle Blumen blühen (TV film, 1984), as Marquis de Formentière
Au théâtre ce soir: Adieu Prudence (TV play, 1985), as Fred Russel

References

External links 

Jean-Claude Pascal Myspace Page : https://www.myspace.com/jeanclaudepascal
 

1927 births
1992 deaths
University of Paris alumni
French male film actors
French gay actors
French LGBT singers
Eurovision Song Contest winners
Eurovision Song Contest entrants for Luxembourg
Eurovision Song Contest entrants of 1961
Eurovision Song Contest entrants of 1981
Burials at Montparnasse Cemetery
20th-century French male actors
20th-century French male singers
French Army personnel of World War II
Recipients of the Croix de Guerre 1939–1945 (France)
Male actors from Paris
Deaths from cancer in France